There was a nominal total of 40 quota places available for para powerlifting at the 2022 Commonwealth Games; 20 each for men and women.

Rules
Each Commonwealth Games Association (CGA) may qualify up to two entries per weight category, which equates to a maximum quota of eight powerlifters. Those entered may contest one category only.

Eight places per category are determined by the World Para Powerlifting (WPPO) Commonwealth Rankings (as of 25 April 2022), with two additional places per category determined by CGF/WPPO Bipartite Invitations.

Timeline

Men's events

Lightweight (up to 72 kg)

Heavyweight (over 72 kg)

Women's events

Lightweight (up to 61 kg)

Heavyweight (over 61 kg)

References

Commonwealth Games
Commonwealth Games
Commonwealth Games
Para powerlifting at the 2022 Commonwealth Games